The Salt Lake Wrestling Club version of the NWA World Tag Team Championship was a professional wrestling championship for tag teams that was promoted between 1955 and 1959 in the Salt Lake Wrestling Club territory of the National Wrestling Alliance (NWA). Local promoter Dave Reynolds promoted the championship primarily in Utah, but would occasionally runs shows in Idaho and Washington state. Since the promotion was a member of the NWA, the Salt Lake Wrestling Club was entitled to promote their local version of the championship, as the NWA bylaws did not restrict the use of that championship in the same way they restricted the NWA World Heavyweight Championship to one nationally recognized championship. In 1957 there were no less than 13 distinct versions of the NWA World Tag Team Championship promoted across the United States. Because the championship was a professional wrestling championship, it was not contested for in legitimate sporting events, but instead determined by the decision of the bookers of a wrestling promotion.

The team of Guy Brunetti and Joe Tangaro were the first recognized champions in the Utah/Idaho region, being introduced as champions no later than December 29, 1955. Records are unclear as to how they won the championship. The championship was active until 1959 with at least 28 different championship reigns. In 1959 the team of Chico Garcia and Chet Wallick became the final champions, as the championship was abandoned when the Salt Lake Wrestling Club was going out of business. Brunetti and Tangaro ended up holding the championship three times, tied with Frank Jares and Great Sasaki for most championships as a team. The Bat held the championship four times, with four different partners, more than any other wrestler. Brunetti and Tangaro's third championship reign lasted at least 95 days, the longest of any reign. Brunetti and Tangaro's three reigns combined to be at least 237 days long. Due to lack of dates for some championship changes it is impossible to determine who held the championship for the shortest period of time; Bill Melby and Blue Avenger's 14 day reign from November 21 to December 10, 1956 is the shortest confirmed reign, but the possibility exists that a shorter reign actually happened.

Title history
Key

Team reigns by combined length
Key

Individual reigns by combined length
Key

Footnotes

Concurrent championships
Sources for 13 simultaneous NWA World Tag Team Championships
NWA World Tag Team Championship (Los Angeles version)
NWA World Tag Team Championship (San Francisco version)
NWA World Tag Team Championship (Central States version)
NWA World Tag Team Championship (Chicago version)
NWA World Tag Team Championship (Buffalo Athletic Club version)
NWA World Tag Team Championship (Georgia version)
NWA World Tag Team Championship (Iowa/Nebraska version)
NWA World Tag Team Championship (Indianapolis version)
NWA World Tag Team Championship (Salt Lake Wrestling Club version)
NWA World Tag Team Championship (Amarillo version)
NWA World Tag Team Championship (Minneapolis version)
NWA World Tag Team Championship (Texas version)
NWA World Tag Team Championship (Mid-America version)

References

National Wrestling Alliance championships
Tag team wrestling championships
Professional wrestling in Utah
World professional wrestling championships